Jacques André Rousseau (born 3 December 1971) is a South African academic, secular activist and social commentator.

Early life
Rousseau was born in Cape Town in 1971. He attended Stellenberg High School and the University of Cape Town (UCT), where he obtained a BA (Hons) in Philosophy and a MA in English.

Academia
Rousseau lectures on critical thinking and ethics in the UCT Commerce Faculty's School of Management Studies. Since his appointment to the UCT academic staff in the 1990s, he has served on various UCT committees including the Senate, the Senate Executive Committee, the Faculty of Commerce Readmission Appeals Committee and the Ethics in Research Committee. He currently serves on the University Information and Communication Technology Committee and the University Student Discipline Tribunal, and is the chairperson of the Academic Freedom Committee. He was elected to both the UCT Senate and Council for the four-year term of office from 1 July 2012 to 30 June 2016.

He also participates in various research activities at UCT. In 2004 he became a member of the National Centre for the Study of Gambling, and from 2008 to 2012 he served as co-ordinator of its Academic Division at UCT which conducted research into gambling in South Africa on behalf of the South African Responsible Gambling Foundation. His current research relates to epistemic standards in science journalism, decision theory, business ethics and religious conflict.

Published works 
 Critical Thinking, Science, and Pseudoscience: Why We Can't Trust Our Brains (Springer Publishing 2016)

Secular activism and social commentary
Rousseau is an atheist, secularist, humanist, naturalist, materialist, freethinker, scientific sceptic and rationalist. In 2006 he established a local community of the Brights movement, which he describes as "an international movement which aims to promote the civic understanding and acknowledgement of the naturalistic world-view, which is free of supernatural and mystical elements". In 2009 he founded the Free Society Institute to promote secularity, scientific reasoning, a naturalistic worldview and freedom of speech.

Since 2008 his blog Synapses has focussed on secular issues in South Africa, and he is on the editorial board of International Humanist News. He was included on a panel of "top skeptic bloggers" who presented a Blogging Skepticism workshop at The Amaz!ng Meeting 2013 conference in Las Vegas organised by the James Randi Educational Foundation.

He regularly contributes to public debates in the South African media. From March 2010 to June 2013, he was a regular contributor for the South African online newspaper the Daily Maverick. He has been interviewed on South African television channels M-Net, eTV and eNCA, and has been quoted in various news publications such as The Independent in the UK and the Financial Mail in South Africa. He has also written op-eds for local newspapers including the Cape Times, the Cape Argus, The Star, The Mercury and the Mail & Guardian.

References

External links

1971 births
20th-century atheists
20th-century essayists
20th-century South African philosophers
21st-century atheists
21st-century essayists
21st-century South African philosophers
Action theorists
Analytic philosophers
Atheism activists
Atheist philosophers
Critical thinking
Critics of religions
Epistemologists
Living people
Mass media theorists
Media critics
Philosophers of culture
Philosophers of economics
Philosophers of history
Philosophers of mind
Philosophers of religion
Philosophers of science
Philosophers of social science
Philosophy writers
Rationalists
Secular humanists
Skeptics
Social commentators
Social philosophers
South African activists
South African atheists
South African bloggers
South African ethicists
South African non-fiction writers
South African naturalists
Theorists on Western civilization
Academic staff of the University of Cape Town
University of Cape Town alumni
White South African people
Writers about activism and social change
Writers about globalization
Writers about religion and science